The Stroud by-election of July was fought on 24 July 1874, due to the election of the incumbent Conservative MP, John Edward Dorington being declared void on petition, due to "bribery, treating, and undue influence".

It was won by the Liberal candidate Henry Brand.

References

1874 in England
Stroud District
1874 elections in the United Kingdom
By-elections to the Parliament of the United Kingdom in Gloucestershire constituencies
19th century in Gloucestershire